Aspro Parks (Aspro Ocio Group) is a Spanish leisure corporation that operates many water parks, amusement parks, aquariums as well as zoos, botanicals and dolphinariums across Europe. The company was founded in October 1991 in Spain, and is headquartered in Madrid. It is best known for its Aqualand theme parks.

Its major brands include Aqualand (waterparks), Marineland (aquatic zoo and dolphinarium) and Bluereef (aquariums). The group operates approx. 60 leisure parks and attraction centers in Spain, the UK, France, Finland, Portugal, Switzerland, Belgium, Holland, Germany, Austria and the Czech Republic.

For the year ended October 2012, the company generated EUR 154.05 million in operating revenue (annual growth of 1.9%) and achieved EUR 37.641 million in net profit (annual decline of 10%). It is owned by Luxembourg-based alternative investment firm Signet Investments S.A.

List of parks
See List of Aspro Parks attractions

External links

 
Amusement park companies
Entertainment companies established in 1991
1991 establishments in Spain